The Secret Garden is a lost 1919 American drama silent film directed by Gustav von Seyffertitz and written by Frances Hodgson Burnett and Marion Fairfax. The film stars Lila Lee, Spottiswoode Aitken, Clarence Geldart, Richard Rosson, Fay Holderness and Ann Malone. The film was released on January 12, 1919, by Paramount Pictures.

Plot
The story is based on Frances Hodgson Burnett's 1911 book, The Secret Garden, about an orphan who is sent to England to her uncle's house, where she finds a beautiful garden with many secrets.

Casting 
 Lila Lee as Mary Lennox
 Spottiswoode Aitken as Archibald Craven
 Clarence Geldart as Dr. Warren Craven
 Richard Rosson as Colin Craven
 Fay Holderness as Mrs. Medlock
 Ann Malone as Martha Sowerby
 Paul Willis as Dickon Sowerby
 Lucille Ward as Mrs. Sowerby
 Mae Wilson as Colin Craven's Nurse
 James Neill as Ben Weatherstaff
 Seymour Hastings as Surgeon Harding
 Rose Dione as Mrs. Lennox
 Larry Steers as Captain Lennox
 Forrest Seabury as Indian Servant
 Miss Gunha as Ayah

References

External links 
 
 

1919 films
1910s English-language films
Silent American drama films
1919 drama films
Paramount Pictures films
Lost American films
Films based on The Secret Garden
Films set in country houses
American black-and-white films
American silent feature films
1919 lost films
Lost drama films
Films directed by Gustav von Seyffertitz
1910s American films